Pommern, formerly Mneme (1903–1908), is an iron-hulled sailing ship. It is a four-masted barque that was built in 1903 at the J. Reid & Co shipyard in Glasgow, Scotland.

Pommern (German for Pomerania) is one of the Flying P-Liners, the famous sailing ships of the German shipping company F. Laeisz. In 1921 the Pommern had to be handed over to Greece as war reparation. In 1923 she was acquired by Gustaf Erikson of Mariehamn in the Finnish Åland archipelago, who used her to carry grain from the Spencer Gulf area in Australia to harbours in England or Ireland until the start of World War II.

On 2 March 1925, Pommern ran aground at Port Germein, South Australia, but she was refloated and returned to service. 

After World War II, Pommern was donated to the town of Mariehamn as a museum ship. It is now a museum ship belonging to the Åland Maritime Museum and is anchored in western Mariehamn, Åland.  A collection of photographs taken by Ordinary Seaman Peter Karney in 1933 showing dramatic pictures of life on a sailing ship rounding Cape Horn can be found in the National Maritime Museum at Greenwich.

A 1:35-scale model of Pommern hangs in Grundtvigs Kirke, in Copenhagen, Denmark, though on being donated to the church in 1939, the model was renamed Dronning Alexandrine in honour of Denmark's then- queen consort.

Pommern is so-called "bald-headed barque": it does not have royals over her upper topgallant sails. The topsails and topgallant sails have been divided in two (upper and lower) to ease their handling.

Pommern has the reputation of being a "lucky ship". She survived both world wars unscathed, lost only four crew members at sea on her journeys, and won the Great Grain Races twice, 1930 and 1937. "Pommern" is thus one of the most popular landmarks of Åland, and is visited by thousands of visitors annually.

In 2019 Pommern was placed in a purpose-built dock facility that can be pumped dry for periodic maintenance of the ship's hull.

Technical details 
Structure: Built of steel
Sail plan: 4 masted barque 
Length: 
Width: 
Draft: 
Gross register tonnage: 2376
Net register tonnage: 2114
Cargo: 
Height of main mast: 
Total area of sails:  
Area of square sails:  
Crew: 26

See also

References

Further reading
 Kåhre, Georg (1978). The Last Tall Ships: Gustav Erikson and the Åland Sailing Fleets 1872–1947. Greenwich: Conway Maritime Press.

External links

Åland Maritime Museum

Barques
Museum ships in Finland
Individual sailing vessels
History of Åland
Tall ships of Finland
Tall ships of Germany
Ships built in Glasgow
Four-masted ships
Windjammers
Mariehamn
Museums in Åland
Maritime incidents in 1928
Maritime incidents in 1935
1903 ships
1903 establishments in Scotland